Terrence Envoh is a Nigerian footballer. He currently plays for Enugu Rangers

Career
Envoh began his career with LEA Primary School Tudun Wada and signed in 2007 with Mighty Jets of Jos Nigeria. His talent was soon discovered by Nigerian premier league side Sharks F.C. of Port Harcourt where he played regularly as a winger / attacking midfielder.
He moved to Bayelsa United for the 2013 season after unsuccessful trials in Switzerland. In February 2014, he followed coach John Obuh to Rangers of Enugu.

International career

Envoh played for the Nigeria national under-17 football team at 2009 FIFA U-17 World Cup in Nigeria and scored one goal against South Korea, Nigeria lost to Switzerland in the finals of the competition.
He was also a member of the Nigerian U-20 squad at the 2011 FIFA U-20 World Cup.

References 

Living people
Nigerian footballers
Nigeria under-20 international footballers
Association football midfielders
Mighty Jets F.C. players
Year of birth missing (living people)
Sportspeople from Jos